is a railway station in the town of Matsushima, Miyagi Prefecture, Japan, operated by East Japan Railway Company (JR East).

Lines
Atago Station is served by the Tōhoku Main Line, and is located 377.2 rail kilometers from the official starting point of the line at Tokyo Station.

Station layout
The station has two unnumbered opposed side platforms. There is no station building and the station is unattended.

Platforms

History
Atago Station opened on July 1, 1962. The station was absorbed into the JR East network upon the privatization of the Japanese National Railways (JNR) on April 1, 1987.

Surrounding area
 Atago Post Office
 Matsushima Junior High School
 Matsushima Second Elementary School

See also
 List of Railway Stations in Japan

External links

  

Railway stations in Miyagi Prefecture
Tōhoku Main Line
Railway stations in Japan opened in 1962
Matsushima, Miyagi
Stations of East Japan Railway Company